Didier Ben Loulou (born 29 May 1958), is a Franco-Israeli photographer.

Biography 
Didier Ben Loulou was born on 29 May 1958, in Paris, France. He studied art history and photography before moving to Israel in 1981, where he volunteered on Kibbutz Ma’agan Michael. He took up photography, working on a first project, Israel Eighties, a series of images in black and white. In 1983, he was admitted to the Mayanot Institute for Jewish Studies in Jerusalem, to study under Rabbi Leon Ashkhenazi (Manitou).

In the next two decades, Didier Ben Loulou undertook a vast photographic project on towns and cities, a collection of portraits under the format of a “photographic repertoire” of urban geographies. In the ancient and historical port of Jaffa and the Ajami Neighbourhood, he observed the comings and goings of populations, their exile and asylum. His focus moved to Jerusalem between the two Intifadas (1991-2008), cornerstone of his work, where he explored the meanders of a city with multiple borders, filled with violence and the sacred. A book, Jérusalem: 1991-2006, was published in 2008.

In the 1990s, Didier Ben Loulou attended a series of seminars in philosophy at the Institute d’Etudes Lévinassiennes in Jerusalem, conducted by Benny Levy.

In the aftermath of the Second Intifada, Didier Ben Loulou begun a new photographic project on the old Jewish cemeteries in and around Jerusalem and in Galilee, seeking the ties between the permanent and the fleeting, away from the tumult of war - forgotten headstones, texts fragments or books left behind on barren hills - .  He questioned the spiritual and the invisible through a series of images on the Hebrew letters, the Aleph-Bet transcending the sacred and the profane, to establish a bond between the living and the dead.

Didier Ben Loulou travelled extensively along the Mediterranean coast, to cities and landscapes, in search of the meaning of wandering. From 2006 to 2008, he photographed gypsies mingling with migrants in Athens, merger of the Third and the Fourth Worlds on the outskirts of the capital. From 2006 to 2019, he finalized a project on Corsica, Sanguinaires, quintessence according to him of the Mediterranean. He examined the notion of re- enchantment and the possibility of happiness in a chaotic world: "I simply want to be the bearer of what is revealed to me, silently and in secret". Since then, Didier Ben Loulou has been leading a nomadic existence between Jerusalem, Marseille, Jaffa, Athens, Tanger, Palermo, Safed, Thessaloniki and Ajaccio.

He is currently working on a new project on Judea.

The square format and colours are all-important features of his work, as well as the Fresson process used to print his analogue images since 1979. He is a Villa Medici Hors les Murs laureate (1995) and the recipient of a Fiacre (French Ministry of Culture) scholarship (1997).  Didier Ben Loulou is the author of about twenty books, including  three journals and reflections on his approach, Chroniques de Jérusalem et d’ailleurs (2016), Un Hiver en Galilée (2018), Mise au Point with Fabien Ribery (2019) and Une année de Solitude (2020).  His works are regularly exhibited in Europe and the United States. The Institute for Contemporary Publishing Archives (IMEC) is the repository of his private archives since 2007. Un Hiver en Galilée (2018), and Mise au Point with Fabien Ribery (2019).

Gallery 
Fresson Prints.

Publications

Monography 
 Je suis du jour, texte Hubert Colas, Carnet de voyages n° 3, Éditions Le Point du jour et FRAC Basse-Normandie, 1996
 Fragments, Chantal Dahan, Éditions Filigranes, Paris, 1997
 Didier Ben Loulou, texte Jacques Py, Éditions Joca Seria, Nantes, 2000
 Vézelay, Éditions Conseil Général de l’Yonne, direction des Affaires culturelles, Auxerre, 2000 
 A Touch of Grace, poèmes de Yehuda Amichaï, catalogue Museum on the Seam, Jérusalem, Israël, 2000
 Sincérité du visage, texte de Catherine Chalier, Éditions Filigranes, Paris, 2004
 Jaffa, la passe, texte de Caroline Fourgeaud-Laville, Éditions Filigranes, Paris, 2006
 Jérusalem, Éditions du Panama, Paris, 2008
 Mémoire des lettres, textes de Catherine Chalier et Betty Rojtman, Éditions de la Table Ronde Paris, 2012
 Athènes, poèmes de  Yorgos Markopoulos, Éditions de La Table Ronde, Paris, 2013
 Marseille, textes de Didier Ben Loulou, Éditions Arnaud Bizalion, Marseille, 2014 
 Je t’écris devant les fenêtres de mon hôtel, notes indiennes, textes Didier Ben Loulou, Éditions Arnaud Bizalion, Marseille, 2016
 Chroniques de Jérusalem et d’ailleurs, Éditions Arnaud Bizalion, Marseille, 2016
  Israel Eighties, Éditions de la Table Ronde, Paris, 2016
 Sud, Éditions de La Table Ronde, Paris, 2018
  Un hiver en Galilée, Éditions Arnaud Bizalion, Marseille, 2018
 Cantique des cantiques, Songes de Leonard Cohen, poème de Zéno Bianu & Odradek, Les éditions de l’Improbable, Paris, 2019 
 Mise au point, conversations avec Fabien Ribery, Éditions Arnaud Bizalion, Marseille, 2019
 Sanguinaires, Éditions de La Table Ronde, Paris, 2020
 Une année de solitude, journal, Éditions Arnaud Bizalion, Marseille, 2021
 La Méditerranée, Tritone Press, USA, 2022

Artist's Books 
 Violence du visage, Emmanuel Levinas, livre d’artiste, 30 copy, Éditions Fata Morgana, Montpellier, 1997
 Dans la langue de personne, poem by Paul Celan, collection Pho’Eau # 6, livre d’artiste, 40 copy, Éditions de l’Eau, 1999
 Portfolio #57, texte de Nicolas Feuillie, 12 copy, Galerie Pennings, Eindhoven, 2002
 Voici des sépultures qui datent des temps anciens, poème d’Ibn Ezra, Le Bousquet-la-Barthe éditions, avec une calligraphie en couverture de Frank Lalou, 2018
 Cantique des cantiques, Songes de Léonard Cohen, poème de Zéno Bianu & Odradek, 40 copy, Les Éditions de l’Improbable, Paris, 2019
 Une image sainte, Fabien Ribery pour dire une photographie de Didier Ben Loulou, 200 copy, Les éditions Les petites allées, 2021

Exhibitions 

 The Gallery of Photographic Art, Tel-Aviv, Israël, 1983
 Palais du Pharo, Marseille, France, 1994
 Centre de la photographie, Genève, Suisse, 1994
 Galerie Graphe, Paris, France, 1994
 Tour du Roy René, Fort Saint-Jean, Marseille, France, 1996
 Centre méditerranéen de la photographie, Paysages des deux rives, Bastia, France, 1996
 Espace Saint-Cyprien, Toulouse, France, 1996
 Centre culturel français, Ramallah et Gaza, Palestine, 1997
 Galerie Camera Obscura, Les Écritures, Paris, France, 1998
 Impressions Gallery, York, Royaume-Uni, 1998
 Oregon Center for the Photographic Arts, Portland (Oregon), États-Unis, 1998
 IFA Galerie, Orient-Traum und Wirklichkeit, Stuttgart, Allemagne, 1999
 Artothèque, Nantes, France, 2000
 Museum on the Seam, A Touch of Grace, Jérusalem, Israël, 2000
 Galerie municipale du Château d'eau, Toulouse, France, 2001
 Vision Gallery, Jérusalem, Israël, 2001
 Musée d'Art et d'Histoire du Judaïsme, Jérusalem, traverses et marges, Paris, France, 2001
 Fotogaleria, Teatro San Martin, Buenos Aires, Argentine, 2001
 Atelier de Visu, Marseille, France, 2001
 Galerie Pennings, Jerusalem: Byways and Sidelines, Eindhoven, Pays-Bas, 2002
 Benham Gallery, Can We Talk Now ? With Simon Norfolk, Seattle, États-Unis, 2003
 Stephen Cohen Gallery, Los Angeles, États-Unis, 2003
 Galerie Rimonim, The Face of a City in Conflict, East Hampton, New York, États-Unis, 2003
 Hovedbiblioteket, Esbjerg, Danemark, 2004
 Galerie Krisal, Sincérité du visage, Genève, Suisse, 2004
 Musée d'Art et d'Histoire du Judaïsme, Rencontres, Paris, 2005
 Museum of Photographic Art, San Diego, États-Unis, 2007
 Galerie Camayeux, Marseille, France, 2007
 Cats & Marbles, Villes d'hier, visages d'aujourd'hui, Mois de la photographie, Athènes, Grèce, 2007
 Le Garage photographie, Marseille, 2013 
 Galerie Le Carré d'art, Athènes, Chartres-de-Bretagne, 2013 
 Le Carré Amelot, Athènes, La Rochelle, 2014
 La Non Maison, D’une ville à l’autre, Aix-en-Provence, 2014 
 Arles, La Bourse du travail, Marseille, Rencontres de la photographie off, Arles, 2014 
 Hôtel Blain, The Tribe, Arles, 2015
 Centre culturel Romain Gary, Vision Fresson, Bernard Plossu et Didier Ben Loulou, Jérusalem, Israël, 2015
 Galerie Malebranche avec Bernard Guillot, Le Caire Jérusalem, Paris, 2017 
Des amours silencieuses : carte blanche à Didier Ben Loulou, Yvelines Antiques, Paris, 2018 
Jérusalem, médiathèque, Berck-sur-Mer, 2018 
 De la lettre à la vie, Galerie Gérard Lévy, Paris, 2019
 Sanguinaires, Galerie Quintessence, Paris, September 2020
 Mediterranean Flux, Naxos, September 2020
 Mémoire des lettres, Biennale Internationale d’Autun, July–August 2021
 Ce désert d’un premier matin du monde, La Non-Maison, Paris, January–February 2022
 Didier Ben Loulou / Photographies, librairie Alain Brieux, Paris, December 2022

Public Collections 
 Museum of Fine Arts, Houston
 Victoria and Albert Museum, London
 Tel Aviv Museum of Art, Israel
 Fonds national d'art contemporain, Paris
 Bibliothèque nationale de France, Paris
 Musée d'Art et d'Histoire du Judaïsme, Paris
 Le château d’eau, pôle photographique de Toulouse, Toulouse, France
 Maison européenne de la photographie, Paris
 Fonds régional d'art contemporain de Basse-Normandie, France
 Société française de photographie, Paris
 Fonds d'acquisition départemental de l'Yonne, France
 Collectivité territoriale de Corse, Ajaccio, France
 Musée Nicéphore-Niépce, Chalon-sur-Saône, France
 Artothèques de Caen, Grenoble, Nantes, Auxerre et Vitré, France
 Espace Saint-Cyprien, Toulouse, France
 Hôtel de Varennes, Montpellier, France
 Musée de la photographie, Charleroi, Belgium
 Rheinisches Landesmuseum, Bonn, Germany
 Musée finlandais de la photographie, Helsinki, Finland
 Fondazione Italiana per la Fotografia, Turin, Italy
 Médiathèque, La Roche-sur-Yon, France
 Fondation Auer-Ory pour la photographie, Hermance, Switzerland
 Centre méditerranéen de la photographie, Bastia, France

Bibliography 
 50 ans de photographie française de 1970 à nos jours, par Michel Poivert, Éditions Textuel, 2019, 
 Conversations 2, par Rémi Coignet, The Eyes Publishing, 2016,

References

External Links 
  Harvard Library, Israel National library of Israel, Bibliothèque Nationale, Paris.
 
 « Le photographe Didier Ben Loulou est notre invité », sur le site 9lives-magazine, 9 décembre 2019.

1958 births
Living people
20th-century French photographers
Fine art photographers
20th-century photographers
Israeli photographers